The Fabric of the Cosmos: Space, Time, and the Texture of Reality (2004) is the second book on theoretical physics, cosmology, and string theory written by Brian Greene, professor and co-director of Columbia's Institute for Strings, Cosmology, and Astroparticle Physics (ISCAP).

Introduction
Greene begins with the key question: "what is reality?", or more specifically, "what is spacetime?" He sets out to describe the features he finds both exciting and essential to forming a full picture of the reality painted by modern science. In almost every chapter, Greene introduces basic concepts and then slowly builds to a climax, usually a scientific breakthrough. Greene then attempts to connect with his reader by posing simple analogies to help explain the meaning of a scientific concept without oversimplifying the theory behind it.

In the preface, Greene acknowledges that some parts of the book are controversial among scientists. He discusses the leading viewpoints in the main text and points of contention in the endnotes. The endnotes contain more complete explanations of points that are simplified in the main text.

Summary

Part I: Reality's Arena
The main focus of Part I is space and time.

Chapter 1, "Roads to Reality", Introduces what is to come later in the book, such as discussions revolving around classical physics, quantum mechanics, and cosmological physics.

Chapter 2, "The Universe and the Bucket", features space as its key point. The question posed by Greene is this: "Is space a human abstraction, or is it a physical entity?" The key thought experiment is a spinning bucket of water, designed to make one think about what creates the force felt inside the bucket when it is spinning. The ideas of Isaac Newton, Ernst Mach, and Gottfried Leibniz on this thought experiment are discussed in detail.

Chapter 3, "Relativity and the Absolute", focuses on spacetime. The question now becomes: "Is spacetime an Einsteinian abstraction or a physical entity?" In this chapter, concepts of both special relativity and general relativity are discussed, as well as their importance to the meaning of spacetime.

In chapter 4, "Entangling Space", Greene explores the revolution of the quantum mechanical era, focusing on what it means for objects to be separate and distinct in a universe dictated by quantum laws. This chapter studies quantum mechanics, including the concepts of probability waves and interference patterns, particle spin, the photon double slit experiment, and Heisenberg's uncertainty principle. The reader is also informed of challenges posed to quantum mechanics by Albert Einstein, Boris Podolsky, and Nathan Rosen.

Part II: Time and Experience
Part II begins by addressing the issue that time is a very familiar concept, yet it is one of humanity's least understood concepts.

Chapter 5, "The Frozen River", deals with the question, "Does time flow?" One key point in this chapter deals with special relativity. Observers moving relative to each other have different conceptions of what exists at a given moment, and hence they have different conceptions of reality. The conclusion is that time does not flow, as all things simultaneously exist at the same time.

Chapter 6, "Chance and the Arrow", asks, "Does time have an arrow?" The reader discovers that the laws of physics apply moving both forward in time and backward in time. Such a law is called  time-reversal symmetry. One of the major subjects of this chapter is entropy. Various analogies are given to illustrate how entropy works and its apparent paradoxes. The climax of the chapter is the co-relation between entropy and gravity, and that the beginning of the Universe must be the state of minimum entropy.

In Chapters 5 and 6, time has been explained only in terms of pre-modern physics. Chapter 7, "Time and the Quantum", gives insights into time's nature in the quantum realm. Probability plays a major role in this chapter because it is an inescapable part of quantum mechanics. The double slit experiment is revisited to reveal things about the past. Many other experiments are presented in this chapter, such as the delayed-choice quantum eraser experiment. Other major issues are brought to the reader's attention, such as quantum mechanics and experience, as well as quantum mechanics and the measurement problem. Finally, this chapter addresses the important subject of decoherence and its relevance towards the macroscopic world.

Part III: Spacetime and Cosmology
Part III deals with the macroscopic realm of the cosmos.

Chapter 8, "Of Snowflakes and Spacetime", tells the reader that the history of the universe is in fact the history of symmetry. Symmetry and its importance to cosmic evolution becomes the focus of this chapter. Again, general relativity is addressed as a stretching fabric of spacetime. Cosmology, symmetry, and the shape of space are put together in a new way.

Chapter 9, "Vaporizing the Vacuum", introduces the theoretical idea of the Higgs boson. This chapter focuses on the critical first fraction of a second after the Big Bang, when the amount of symmetry in the universe was thought to have changed abruptly by a process known as symmetry breaking. This chapter also brings into play the theory of grand unification and entropy is also revisited.

Chapter 10, "Deconstructing the Bang", makes inflationary cosmology the main point. General relativity and the discovery of dark energy (repulsive gravity) are taken into account, as well as the cosmological constant. Certain problems that arise due to the standard Big Bang theory are addressed, and new answers are given using inflationary cosmology. Such problems include the horizon problem and the flatness problem. Matter distribution throughout the cosmos is also discussed, including the concepts of dark matter and dark energy.

Chapter 11, "Quanta in the Sky with Diamonds", continues with the topic of inflation, and the arrow of time is also discussed again. The chapter addresses three main developments: the formation of structures such as galaxies, the amount of energy required to spawn the universe we now see, and the origin of time's arrow.

Part IV: Origins and Unification
Part IV deals with new theoretical aspects of physics, particularly in the author's field.

Chapter 12, "The World on a String", informs the reader of the structure of the fabric of space according to string theory. New concepts are introduced, including the Planck length and the Planck time, and ideas from The Elegant Universe are revisited. The reader will learn how string theory could fill the gaps between general relativity and quantum mechanics.

Chapter 13, "The Universe on a Brane", expands on ideas from chapter 12, particularly on M-theory, of which string theory is a branch. This chapter is devoted to speculations on space and time. The insights of a number of physicists, including Edward Witten and Paul Dirac, are presented. The focus of the chapter becomes gravity and its involvement with extra dimensions. Near the end of the chapter, a brief section is devoted to the cyclic model.

Part V: Reality and Imagination
Part V deals with many theoretical concepts, including space and time travel.

Chapter 14, "Up in the Heavens and Down on the Earth", is about various experiments with space and time. Previous theories are brought back from previous chapters, such as Higgs theory, supersymmetry, and string theory. Future planned experiments are described in an attempt to verify many of the theoretical concepts discussed, including the constituents of dark matter and dark energy, the existence of the Higgs boson, and the verification of extra spatial dimensions.

Chapter 15, "Teleporters and Time Machines", is about traveling through space and time using intriguing methods. Quantum mechanics is brought back into the picture when the reader comes across teleportation. Puzzles of time travel are posed, such as the idea of time travel to the past being a possibility. The end of the chapter focuses on wormholes and the theory behind them.

Chapter 16, "The Future of an Allusion", focuses on black holes and their relationship to entropy. The main idea of this chapter is that spacetime may not be the fundamental makeup of the universe's fabric.

Reception
The Fabric of the Cosmos became the most popular science book among Amazon.com customers in 2005 and was on The New York Times Best Seller list—from its publication on February 10, 2004, it appeared 10 times in the Non-Fiction top 15, peaking at number 3 on April 4, before dropping off the list on May 9. With a first printing of 125,000 and as a main selection of the Book of the Month Club, Knopf expected it to do well.

Adaptation
NOVA made a documentary sequel to the popular Elegant Universe adaptation based on this book The Fabric of the Cosmos and with the same name. The series is hosted by Greene and includes commentary by numerous other renowned physicists, such as Max Tegmark and others.

This documentary series is composed of 4 episodes (5–8 of season 39, 2011–2012) of the Nova television series:
 The Fabric of the Cosmos: What is Space?
 The Fabric of the Cosmos: The Illusion of Time
 The Fabric of the Cosmos: Quantum Leap
 The Fabric of the Cosmos: Universe or Multiverse?
Lynn Elber of Associated Press called it, "Mind-blowing TV."

Publication data
 The Fabric of the Cosmos: Space, Time, and the Texture of Reality (2004). Alfred A. Knopf division, Random House,

See also
 The Fabric of Reality
 The Elegant Universe
 The Science of Interstellar
 The Universe in a Nutshell

Notes

External links
 PBS-TV/NOVA: The Fabric Of The Cosmos (Updated: November 2011).
 TV series on IMDb

2004 non-fiction books
Alfred A. Knopf books
Books by Brian Greene
Cosmology books
Popular physics books
String theory books